Aura is a municipality of Finland. The name derives from the river Aura and the plough (aura in Finnish) reminiscent shape of the municipality. The municipality was established in 1917 from parts of Lieto and Pöytyä.

It is part of the Varsinais-Suomi region.

The municipality is unilingually Finnish.

Geography

Villages 
In 1967, Aura had 23 legally recognized villages (henkikirjakylät):

 Auvainen
 Hypöinen
 Ihava
 Järvenoja
 Järykselä
 Kaerla
 Karviainen
 Kinnarla
 Kuuskoski
 Käetty
 Lahto
 Laukkaniitty
 Leikola
 Leinikkala
 Leppäkoski
 Paimala
 Pitkäniitty
 Prunkkala
 Puho
 Seppälä
 Sikilä
 Simola
 Viilaila

History 

The area was initially a part of the Lieto parish. A church was built in the village of Prunkkala in 1636, forming a new chapel community. In 1908, an order to separate Prunkkala from Lieto was made. The villages of Kuuskoski, Hypöinen, Viilala and Lahto were transferred to it from Pöytyä. The parish became fully independent in 1917 under the current name Aura, after the Aura train station and the community that had formed around it in the late 19th century.

Demographics 
In 2020, 19.0% of the population of Aura was under the age of 15, 60.2% were aged 15 to 64, and 20.8% were over the age of 65. The average age was 42.0, under the national average of 43.4 and regional average of 44.0. Speakers of Finnish made up 96.8% of the population and speakers of Swedish made up 0.6%, while the share of speakers of foreign languages was 2.6%. Foreign nationals made up 2.1% of the total population. 

The chart below, describing the development of the total population of Aura from 1975-2020, encompasses the municipality's area as of 2021.

Urban areas 
In 2019, out of the total population of 3,941, 2,705 people lived in urban areas and 1,166 in sparsely populated areas, while the coordinates of 70 people were unknown. This made Aura's degree of urbanization 69.9%. The urban population in the municipality was divided between two urban areas as follows:

Economy 
In 2018, 5.2% of the workforce of Aura worked in primary production (agriculture, forestry and fishing), 34.9% in secondary production (e.g. manufacturing, construction and infrastructure), and 57.6% in services. In 2019, the unemployment rate was 5.7%, and the share of pensioners in the population was 23.7%. 

The ten largest employers in Aura in 2019 were as follows:

See also
 Aura River
 Finnish national road 9

Notes

References

External links

Municipality of Aura – Official website 

 
Populated places established in 1917